Phil Green is an American politician from Michigan. Green is a Republican member of Michigan House of Representatives from District 67.

Education 
In 1999, Green earned a BS degree in Bible/Biblical Studies from Pensacola Christian College. In 2009, Green earned a MA degree in Biblical Exposition from Pensacola Theological Seminary.

Career 
Green was a pastor and a chaplain. In 2012, Green became a school administrator.

On November 6, 2018, Green won the election and became a Republican member of the Michigan House of Representatives for District 84. Green defeated William Shoot with 67.04% of the votes.

Personal life 
Green's wife is Marun. In 2012, Green moved back to Michigan. Green lives in Millington, Michigan.

Electoral history

2022

2018

See also 
 2018 Michigan House of Representatives election

References

External links 
 Phil Green at ballotpedia

21st-century American politicians
Living people
Republican Party members of the Michigan House of Representatives
People from Tuscola County, Michigan
Year of birth missing (living people)